Klavio Meça (9 April 1996 – 26 December 2020) was an Albanian swimmer. He competed in the men's 200 metre freestyle event at the 2017 World Aquatics Championships. 

He had a number of sporting achievements. In Budapest, Hungary he set a new national record in the 400 m freestyle with a total time of 4:04:03.

Meça died at the age of 24 on 26 December 2020. No cause of death was reported.

References

1996 births
2020 deaths
Albanian male freestyle swimmers
Place of birth missing
21st-century Albanian people